Paul Ramsey may refer to:

Paul Ramsey (politician), Canadian politician
Paul Ramsey (footballer) (born 1962), Northern Irish footballer
Paul Ramsey (ethicist) (1913–1988), American ethicist
Paul Ramsey (musician) (born 1966), American drummer
Paul Ray Ramsey (born 1963), American YouTube personality and public speaker
Paul H. Ramsey,  United States Navy naval aviator